The Moskvitch G4 were sports cars from Moskvitch released in 1963. Like the G3, they used the same engine as the Moskvitch 407. In 1965, all three G4's were re-engined with units based on the engine in the Moskvitch 408. These engines were fitted with twin Weber 40DCO carburettors, advanced valve timing, and new camshafts giving . The G4's were then redesignated as G4A's. During 1967–1968, the two remaining G4A's were converted into G4M's. Two G4M's were rebuilt into Moskvitch G5's in 1968. The third G4M was raced until 1972 (it was not converted). The G4's had independent suspension, both front and rear (from the Moskvitch 407), and were successful in several USSR championships.

Sports cars
G4
Motorsport in the Soviet Union